Akwa Ibom State University (AKSU) was conceived and funded by the Akwa Ibom State Government. Unity of people with a passion to constantly seek knowledge that addresses practical issues of development in Nigeria. The university opened its doors to its pioneer students in the 2010/2011 academic year.

The campus
At conception, the university was to be located within Akwa Ibom State's Technology Triangle at the University Town. However, the administration of the Akwa Ibom State Government have changed the enabling law of the university into a multi-campus institution with the main campus at Ikot Akpaden, Mkpat Enin L.G.A and a second campus fondly known as Abak Campus situated at Obio Akpa, Oruk Anam L.G.A. The goals of the university have been modified by the administration of the State Government in order to transform the university into a conventional university whose focus is not just Technology and Applied Science but also Arts. In line with this transformation, the name of the institution has been changed from Akwa Ibom State University of Technology to Akwa Ibom State University.

How it Began
On October 18, 2000, at Uyo, Akwa Ibom State, Nigeria, the Executive Governor of Akwa Ibom State at the time, Arc (Obong) Victor Attah inaugurated a committee for the establishment of Akwa Ibom State University of Technology.

The committee was made up of Professor Ephraim E. Okon, Professor Ekong E. Ekong, Professor Ulo K. Enyenihi, Professor Reuben K. Udo, Professor E. W. Mbipom, Engr. Mrs. Mayen Adetiba, Engr. Esio O. Mboho, Engr. Akpan U. Ukpoho, Engr. Uyai Ekaette, Dr. Usen J. Antia, Sir Pius Wilson, Dr. Engineer Linus Asuquo, Mr. Moses Essien, Dr. Ini Udoka, Professor Joe Uyanga and Mr. E. J. Akpan. The University opened its doors to its pioneer students in the 2010/2011 academic year.

There was a mandate to establish AKUTECH, a project which has been embraced by the former Executive Governor of Akwa Ibom State, Obong (Barr) Godswill Akpabio leading to the enactment of the University Law on September 15, 2009 by the Akwa Ibom State House of Assembly.

Vice Chancellors
 Professor Sunday Petters pioneer vice chancellor till 2015
 Professor Eno J. Ibanga 2015 till 2020
 Professor Nse Essien 2020 till date

Staff development
More than 60 faculty members are undergoing AKSU-sponsored postgraduate training in universities in Europe, North America and Singapore. More centres of excellence have been identified in South America, Japan and other Asian countries for further collaboration and manpower development.

Faculties
  Faculty of Engineering
Departments;
Chemical/Petrochemical Engineering, 
Mechanical/Aerospace Engineering,
Civil Engineering,
Marine/Naval Architecture Engineering,
Agricultural Engineering.
Electrical/Electronic engineering.

  Faculty of Physical science
Department; Physics science, Chemistry science, Mathematics and Statistics, Geology, Computer science.
  Faculty of Biological sciences 
Department; Biological Science, Zoology, Botany, Microbiology, Marine biology, Genetics and Biotechnology
  Faculty of Education
Mathematics Education,
Chemistry Education,
Biology Education,
Integrated Science Education,
Physics Education.
  Faculty of Agriculture
Agricultural Economic and Extension,
Soil Science,
Crop Science,
Animal Science.
  Faculty of Social Sciences
Public Administration,
Mass communication,
Economics,
Political Sciences.
  Faculty of Arts
English and Literary Studies,
Religious and Cultural Studies,
Performing Art(Theater Art).
History and international studies,
Philosophy.
  Faculty of Management Science
Accounting,
Marketing,
Business Administration

References

External links
 Akwa Ibom State University website
 Akwa Ibom State University Official Facebook Account

Akwa Ibom State University
Education in Akwa Ibom State
2010 establishments in Nigeria
Educational institutions established in 2010
Public universities in Nigeria